Hameed Chennamangaloor (Abdul Hameed Areepattamannil; born 1948) is a prominent social critic in Kerala, India. He is a staunch critic of religious fundamentalism. He was born to Areepattamannil Abdul Salam of Chennamangaloor and Katheeshumma of Perumanna. He had his early education at Chennamangaloor and Mukkam. After getting his BA and MA degrees, he began his career as a probationary officer in State Bank of Travancore. Later, he left the job and took up a job under the Department of Higher Education, Government of Kerala, as a lecturer of English language and literature. He became the Head of the Department of English at Government Arts and Science College, Kozhikode in 2002, a position which he held until his retirement in 2003.

Writer and Orator
Hameed Chennamangaloor has authored several books in Malayalam. Besides, he contributes to Malayalam magazines and dailies regularly. He makes public speeches, too. He frequently gives radio talks on Akashvani's local station. Hameed has also been frequently interviewed about matters relating to contemporary affairs in the press and on the television.

Selected books 
 'Deivathinte rashtriyam' (Politics of God) (Mathrubhumi Books, 2011)
 Marxism, Islamism, Secularism (Mathrubhumi Books, 2009)
 ' Beegarathayude dhaivashasthram' (D. C. Books, 2007)
 ' Hameed Chennamangaloorinte thiranjedutha lekhanangal' (Haritham Books, 2007)
 ' Matham, rashtreeyam, janadhipathyam' (Mathrubhumi Books, 2005)
 ' Oru Indian Musliminte sothanthra chindhakal' (Translation)

Selected articles 
 Mathrubhumi Weekly, 16 May 2010

References

External links 
The Official Blog of Hameed Chennamangaloor

Living people
Writers from Kozhikode
20th-century Indian Muslims
Malayalam-language writers
1948 births
Kozhikode east
Indian religious writers